was a Japanese writer. He was born in Yokohama, Japan.

Major works
Matsunaga's major works include:

 夢を喰ふ人

1895 births
1938 deaths
Japanese writers
People from Yokohama